is a former Japanese football player.

He is now a coach for Cerezo Osaka youth academy.

Club statistics

References

External links

1987 births
Living people
Association football people from Osaka Prefecture
Japanese footballers
J1 League players
J2 League players
Cerezo Osaka players
Association football midfielders